Henry Ruffner (January 16, 1790 – December 17, 1861), was an educator and Presbyterian minister, who served as president of Washington College (now Washington and Lee University). Although a slaveholder (and whose family had long owned slaves), Ruffner became known for criticizing slavery as impeding Virginia's economic development before the American Civil War, although that controversial position caused him to resign his college presidency and retire to his farm.

Early life and education
Ruffner was born on January 16, 1790, near the Willow Grove Mills on Hawkshill Creek in Page County. about a mile above Luray, Virginia, to the former Lydia Ann Brumbach and her husband David C. Ruffner. In 1794, his grandfather, Joseph Ruffner Sr., bought land across the Appalachian Mountains in the Kanawha River Valley from John Dickinson, including a famous salt spring. After visiting in 1795, he moved to the area, joined within a year by his five sons, daughter and their families. Joseph Ruffner continued to buy land nearby, as well as the defensive Clendenin Blockhouse, into which his firstborn son David Ruffner (1767-1843), would move in 1796 with his three sons (and in which his fourth and arguably most successful son, Lewis Ruffner would be born in 1797). When Joseph Ruffner Sr. died in 1803, his property was divided among his sons David (Henry's father), Daniel, Joseph Jr., Samuel, Abraham and Tobias. David Ruffner received the property closest to the future capital city of Charleston, West Virginia (the whole bottom from the mouth of Campbell's Creek to the cross line above Malden), including the famous salt lick, which his father had allowed Elisha Brooks to lease and try to develop. Soon, David and his brother Joseph Jr. decided to develop it themselves. Accordingly, in 1805 David Ruffner bought a mill and house from George Alderson and moved his family to Malden (called the Kanawha Salines until the 1850s), where he began developing the salt works (a/k/a salines) using enslaved labor. Meanwhile, Tobias Ruffner built his own saline above Campbell's Creek, and between 1799 and 1812, fellow settlers several times elected David Ruffner as one of their two representatives (on a part-time basis) in the Virginia House of Delegates. By 1815, the number of salt furnaces had reached 52 and extended four miles below and 3 miles above the original Ruffner operation, and wood to fire the boiling evaporation vats was becoming scarce, until David Ruffner managed to convert that part of the operation to coal. In 1817, David (who earned the honorific "Colonel") and his brothers Joseph Jr and Daniel Ruffner were among the founders of the Kanawha Salt Company, a local trust or salt production monopoly formed at the instigation of lawyer Joseph Lovell.

Young Henry did not show any inclination to be either a farmer nor salt-maker (at which his younger brother Lewis Ruffner would excel), but became known for his love of reading. When he was 19, his father sent him to Lewisburg, where Rev. McElhenney, a South Carolininan who had graduated from Washington College and then been sent by the Lexington Presbytery across the Appalachians to Greenbrier and Monroe Counties, had settled the previous year. Rev. McElhenney established a school which would become known as the "Lewisburg Academy" and which he would run for two decades (he would lead his congregation for 60 years). Ruffner mastered McElhenney's classical curriculum by May 1812, then went to Lexington, Virginia, where he attended McElhenney's alma mater, Washington College, and finished the four year curriculum in a year and a half. He studied under Professor William Graham (who had graduated from Princeton in 1773). After graduating in 1814, Ruffner continued his divinity studies and was ordained a Presbyterian minister in 1815, with instructions to establish the presbytery in the Kanawha valley. Ruffner would receive a Doctor of Divinity degree from Princeton in 1838.

Family life and slaveholdings

Ruffner married twice. On March 30, 1819, Ruffner married Sarah M. Lyle in Rockbridge County (of which Lexington remains the county seat). They had children: Julia, William (1824-1928), Anne and David. After Sarah's death, Ruffer married Laura Jane Kirby in November 1849 in Hamilton Ohio, but their only child died as an infant.

Rev. Ruffner owned 4 slaves in the 1820 federal census, 6 slaves in the 1830 federal census, and 4 slaves in the 1840 federal census. He may have freed his slaves after his 1847 publications discussed below, but is missing from the 1850 census as digitized, though entries include merchant Lewis Ruffner in Louisville, Kentucky, as well as various relative Ruffners in Kanawha County. In particular, his brother Lewis and uncle Joseph Ruffner were major slaveholders, owning 47 and 25 slaves respectively in Kanawha County in 1850. Other slaveholding Kanawha Ruffners in 1850 included: Charles Ruffner with 8 slaves, James Ruffner with 12 slaves, Augustus Ruffner with 5 slaves, Joel Ruffner with 8 slaves, and Isaac Ruffner with 3 slaves. In the 1860 federal census, the 70 year old reverend and his 32 year old wife Laura J Ruffner were living with James and Eliza Gaines' family at the Kanawha salines, at which time Ruffner owned $13,000 of real estate and $3,000 in personal property (which technically could include slaves, although he is absent from the corresponding slave schedules, and the listed head-of-household Gaines had no real nor personal property).. Evidence that he did own slaves at least through 1861 is given in Henry's last will, written November 8, 1861. In it he bequeaths to his wife Laura Jane, "the possession, use and benefit of my servant woman Martha and her five children during the term of her [Laura Jane's] natural life if she dies unmarried, but if she marry again then Martha and her children revert to my estate, but in no event are those servants to be moved out of the county of Kanawha without the consent of my executor."

Career

In 1819, in addition to his duties at various churches in the area, and with his family's farms, Ruffner returned to Washington College as a professor of ancient languages, holding that post until 1837, during which time he twice served as acting president. In 1837 Ruffner became the college's president and delivered an inaugural address that emphasized such classic themes as self-control and the importance of education in guiding American society. In 1847 Ruffner published an anti-slavery pamphlet, Address to the People of West Virginia; showing the Slavery is Injurious to the Public Welfare, (that became known as the "Ruffner pamphlet").  The pamphlet grew out of a debate that Ruffner had before Lexington's Franklin Society over slavery with Lexington Law School Professor John White Brockenbrough and Virginia Military Institute Professor Francis Henney Smith. At the time, his son William H. Ruffner, had withdrawn from Princeton University because of ill health, though he traveled in Montgomery County Maryland collecting manumitted slaves for emigration to Liberia as an agent of the American Colonization Society. Though the elder Ruffner was quite critical of "abolitionists," he argued against slavery on economic grounds and was criticized occasionally by proslavery politicians in Virginia in the decade before the war. This moderate anti-slavery position seems to have represented something of a change because in 1839 Ruffner had published a novella, Judith Bensaddi whose title character argued against abolition of slavery.
During his presidency, such speakers as Princeton educator Archibald Alexander (himself a graduate of Liberty Hall, the predecessor of Washington College), Minister Elias Lyman Magoon, and Professor George Dabney delivered graduation addresses at Washington College. Among Ruffner's colleagues at Washington College were George Dabney and George Dod Armstrong.

Ruffner's views brought him into conflict with some members of the College and Lexington community, where relations were already strained because of conflicts between the missions of Washington College and the nearby Virginia Military Institute, as well as because of sectarian disputes.  Ruffner tendered his resignation as president in 1848. He was replaced by George Junkin, then president of Lafayette College, who had lost his job at Miami University in Ohio a few years early for his pro-slavery views.

Ruffner spent some time teaching at the University of Virginia in 1850 and 1851; In 1850 he published The Fathers of the Desert. Apart from his farming activities, Ruffner visited Louisville, Kentucky, where he continued his anti-slavery advocacy.  He is purported to be the author of a brief attack published around 1849 on Ellwood Fisher's proslavery pamphlet, Lecture on the North and South, though the attribution is questionable. Ruffner then returned to Kanawha; he delivered a pro-Union speech in on July 4, 1856.

Death and legacy

Ruffner died at his home in Malden shortly after the Civil War began and western Virginians voted to secede from Virginia. He is buried at the Ruffner family cemetery in Malden, and is also one of the subjects of the memorial at Stonewall Jackson Memorial Cemetery in Lexington, together with his son William Henry Ruffner, who had remained in the Shenandoah Valley likewise became a minister, educator, Virginia's first superintendent of public education after the war's end, and then president of the first female normal school (which later became Longwood University.

References 

1790 births
1861 deaths
Washington and Lee University faculty
Washington and Lee University alumni
Presidents of Washington and Lee University
American Presbyterian ministers
People from Page County, Virginia
People from the Shenandoah Valley
People from Malden, West Virginia
American slave owners
19th-century American clergy
Ruffner family